David James Hughes (born 27 April 1943) is a Welsh footballer, who played as a winger in the Football League for Tranmere Rovers.

References

External links

1943 births
Tranmere Rovers F.C. players
Wrexham A.F.C. players
Ellesmere Port Town F.C. players
English Football League players
Association football wingers
Living people
Welsh footballers
People from Connah's Quay
Sportspeople from Flintshire